Stefano Pastrello (born 1 January 1984) is an Italian footballer.

Biography
Born in Camposampiero, Veneto, Pastrello started his career at Lombard club A.C. Milan. On the last league match of 2002–03 Serie A season (also the match before the 2003 UEFA Champions League Final and 2003 Coppa Italia Final), Pastrello along with 10 others Primavera team players were call-up to the match as starters and bench player. He substituted Catilina Aubameyang in the 61st minutes. The match Piacenza won Milan 4-2, as Milan only filled first team backup player likes Valerio Fiori and Primavera youth team player. On 30 June 2003, he was transferred to Verona in co-ownership deal, in exchange with Enrico Cortese. (who also from Veneto and was a teammate at AC Milan youth team 2000-01)

He failed to make a single league appearances for Verona, and was loaned to Martina, Portogruaro, Modica and Poggibonsi of Serie C1 & Serie C2. In the last season, the played once for Verona at Coppa Italia Serie C. In 2008-09 season, he left for Veneto side Este at Serie D.

References

External links
 
 Profile at FIGC 
 

Italian footballers
Italy youth international footballers
Serie A players
A.C. Milan players
Hellas Verona F.C. players
A.S.D. Portogruaro players
U.S. Poggibonsi players
A.S.D. Martina Calcio 1947 players
Association football midfielders
Sportspeople from the Province of Padua
1984 births
Living people
Footballers from Veneto